The Nashville Vols Minor League Baseball team played 62 seasons in Nashville, Tennessee, from 1901 to 1963; they were inactive in 1962 due to declining attendance and the Southern Association (SA) ceasing operations after 1961. Over 9,015 regular season games, the Vols compiled a win–loss record of 4,569–4,446 (.507). They qualified for postseason playoffs on 16 occasions and had a postseason record of 108–74 (.593). Nashville won eight SA pennants, nine SA playoff championships, and four Dixie Series titles. Combining all 9,197 regular season and postseason games, the Vols had an all-time record of 4,677–4,520 (.509).

The Nashville Baseball Club was formed as a charter member of the newly organized Southern Association in 1901. The team did not receive its official moniker, the Nashville Volunteers, until 1908. However, the team was, and is, commonly referred to as the Vols. Their last season in the Southern Association was 1961. After sitting out the 1962 season, Nashville returned for a final campaign as a part of the South Atlantic League in 1963.

The Vols competed at four class levels: Class B (1901), Class A (1902–1935), Class A1 (1936–1945), and Double-A (1946–1961, 1963). Today, all Minor League Baseball teams are affiliated with a Major League Baseball team to develop players for the major league club. However, it was not until the 1930s that Nashville entered into such major league affiliations on a consistent basis. The Vols were affiliated with eight teams across 29 seasons and were unaffiliated in the other 33 seasons. Their longest affiliation was with the Chicago Cubs for nine seasons (1943–1951), followed by the Cincinnati Reds/Redlegs (8 seasons; 1936–1937, 1955–1960), New York Giants (5 seasons; 1934–1935, 1952–1954), Brooklyn Dodgers (3 seasons; 1938–1940), and one season each with the Cleveland Naps (1908), Minnesota Twins (1961), Chicago White Sox (1920), and Los Angeles Angels (1963).

The team's best season record occurred in 1940 when they finished 101–47 (.682). The 1940 team was ranked as the 47th best minor league of all time in a 2001 ranking by baseball historians. Their lowest season record was 45–92 (.328) in 1906. Of the eight major league affiliations in Nashville's history, the team recorded its best record from 1938 to 1940 as a Brooklyn Dodgers affiliate. The team had a regular season record of 270–181 (.599) during that time. They reached the postseason in all three seasons, winning two playoff championships and one Dixie Series title. Their postseason record was 25–16 (.610). Conversely, the team's lowest record was as a Los Angeles Angels affiliate in 1963. The Vols compiled a 53–86 (.381) record and failed to reach the postseason in their lone year with the Angles and their final year of competition.

Table key

Season-by-season records

Franchise totals

References

Seasons